The Intercontinentals is the 16th album by Bill Frisell to be released on the Elektra Nonesuch label. It was released in 2003 and features performances by Frisell, Sidiki Camara, Vinicius Cantuaria, Christos Govetas, Greg Leisz and Jenny Scheinman.

Reception

Response was positive, with Metacritic assigned album an aggregate score of 86 out of 100 based on 7 critical reviews indicating "Universal Acclaim". The Allmusic review by Thom Jurek awarded the album 4.5 stars, stating, "This is a remarkable album; its sets a new watermark for Frisell's sense of adventure and taste, and displays his perception of beauty in a pronounced, uncompromising, yet wholly accessible way".

Track listing
All compositions by Bill Frisell except as indicated.

 "Boubacar" – 6:13  
 "Good Old People" – 5:25  
 "For Christos" – 6:13 
 "Baba Drame" (Traoré) – 5:18  
 "Listen" – 6:47  
 "Anywhere Road" – 1:52  
 "Procissão" (Gil) – 6:43  
 "The Young Monk" (Traditional) – 2:23  
 "We Are Everywhere" – 7:06  
 "Yála" (Govetas) – 5:47  
 "Perritos" (Cantuaria) – 4:33  
 "Magic" – 5:54  
 "Eli" – 4:15  
 "Remember" – 1:36

Personnel
Bill Frisell – electric and acoustic guitars, loops, bass
Sidiki Camara – calabash, djembe, congas, percussion, vocals
Vinicius Cantuaria – electric and acoustic guitars, vocals, drums, percussion
Christos Govetas – oud, vocals, bouzouki
Greg Leisz – slide guitars, pedal steel guitar
Jenny Scheinman – violin

References 

2003 albums
Bill Frisell albums
Nonesuch Records albums